Titova may refer to:

 Korenica, intermittently named Titova Korenica, a village in Croatia
 Titova Mitrovica, city and municipality in northern Kosovo
 The feminine form of the Russian surname Titov